The A197 is a road in Northumberland, in the United Kingdom. It connects Morpeth, Pegswood, Ashington and Newbiggin by the Sea.

History

Route
The road starts at the A1 and heads north into Loansdean and Morpeth, where it has a junction with the A192 and then leaves north until it reaches a roundabout with the B1337.

From the roundabout it heads east, passing Pegswood on its north and enters into Ashington where it has a junction with the A1068 and a junction with the A196. After leaving Ashington it reaches its west terminus at a roundabout with the A189.

Junctions
{| class="plainrowheaders wikitable"
|-
!scope=col|County
!scope=col|Location
!scope=col|mi
!scope=col|km
!scope=col|Destinations
!scope=col|Notes
|-
|rowspan="9"|Northumberland
|rowspan="5"|Morpeth
|0
|0
| bgcolor="ffdddd" |  – Newcastle upon Tyne
| bgcolor="ffdddd" |Southbound entrance to A1 and Northbound exit from A1 only
|-
|1.4
|2.3
|B6524 – Whalton
|
|-
|2.0
|3.2
|  – Nedderton
|
|-
|2.3
|3.7
|  – Pigdon
|
|-
|3.6
|5.8
|B1337 – Longhirst
|
|-
| rowspan="4" |Ashington
|6.5
|10.4
|  – Guide Post, Bedlington
|
|-
|6.8
|10.9
|  – Widdrington
|
|-
|7.8
|12.6
|  – Guide Post
|
|-
|9.1
|14,7
|  – Cramlington, Widdrington
|

References

Roads in England
Roads in Northumberland